Code-Zero or variant, may refer to:
Code-Zero, a Japanese-only Square-Enix videogame for the Sharp X68000, see List of Enix games#C
Code 0 sail, a type of spinnaker
Code 0 (Network Unreachable), a response code for IP in IP

See also
 Code to Zero, novel